3737 Beckman, provisional designation , is a stony asteroid and sizable Mars-crosser on an eccentric orbit from the inner regions of the asteroid belt, approximately  in diameter. It was discovered on 8 August 1983, by American astronomer Eleanor Helin at the Palomar Observatory in California. The S-type asteroid has a rotation period of 3.1 hours. It was named for American Chemist Arnold Beckman.

Orbit and classification 

Beckman is a member of the Mars-crossing asteroids, a dynamically unstable group between the main belt and the near-Earth populations, crossing the orbit of Mars at 1.66 AU. It orbits the Sun at a distance of 1.5–3.4 AU once every 3 years and 9 months (1,363 days; semi-major axis of 2.41 AU). Its orbit has an eccentricity of 0.40 and an inclination of 20° with respect to the ecliptic. The body's observation arc begins with its official discovery observation at Palomar in August 1983.

Naming 

This minor planet was named after Arnold Orville Beckman (1900–2004), an American chemist and inventor of the first (potentiometric) pH meter. The official  was published by the Minor Planet Center on 17 August 1989.

Physical characteristics 

In the SMASS classification, Beckman is a common, stony S-type asteroid, the most common type in the innermost region of the Solar System.

Rotation period 

A rotational lightcurve of Beckman was obtained from photometric observations by Polish astronomer Wiesław Wiśniewski during 1986–1987. Lightcurve analysis gave a well-defined rotation period of  hours with a brightness amplitude of 0.16 magnitude.

Observations by Daniel Klinglesmith at Etscorn Campus Observatory  in November 2013, gave a period of 3.130 hours and an amplitude of 0.27 magnitude. Serbian astronomer Vladimir Benishek at the Belgrade Astronomical Observatory measured a period of 3.125 hours in December 2017, and in March 2018, Robert Stephens at the Center for Solar System Studies  in California determined a period of 3.113.

Diameter and albedo 

According to the survey carried out by the NEOWISE mission of NASA's Wide-field Infrared Survey Explorer, Beckman measures 6.97 kilometers in diameter and its surface has an albedo of 0.29. However, a 2017-WISE-study dedicated to Mars-crossing asteroids gave larger diameter of 14.36 kilometers due to a much lower albedo of 0.094. The Collaborative Asteroid Lightcurve Link assumes a standard albedo for a stony asteroid of 0.20 and derives a diameter of 7.89 kilometers based on an absolute magnitude of 12.88.

Sizable Mars-crosser 

With an averaged diameter of 10 kilometers, Beckman is one of several "sizable" Mars-crossing asteroids such as 3581 Alvarez (13.69 km) 1065 Amundsenia (9.75 km), 1139 Atami (9.35 km), 1474 Beira (15.46 km), 1011 Laodamia (7.39 km), 1727 Mette (5.44 km), 1131 Porzia (7.13 km), 1235 Schorria (5.55 km), 985 Rosina (8.18 km), 1310 Villigera (15.24 km), and 1468 Zomba (7 km), which are smaller than the largest members of this dynamical group, namely, 132 Aethra, 323 Brucia (former Mars-crosser), 1508 Kemi, 2204 Lyyli and 512 Taurinensis, all larger than 20 kilometers.

Notes

References

External links 
 Asteroid Lightcurve Database (LCDB), query form (info )
 Dictionary of Minor Planet Names, Google booksBehrend
 Discovery Circumstances: Numbered Minor Planets (1)-(5000) – Minor Planet Center
 
 

003737
Discoveries by Eleanor F. Helin
Named minor planets
003737
19830808